This is a list of 362 species in Plectris, a genus of May beetles and junebugs in the family Scarabaeidae.

Plectris species

 Plectris abdominalis Frey, 1967 c g
 Plectris aberrans Frey, 1964 c g
 Plectris abnormalis (Moser, 1919) c g
 Plectris acreensis Frey, 1973 c g
 Plectris acutesetosa Frey, 1974 c g
 Plectris aenea Blanchard, 1851 c g
 Plectris aeneicollis (Moser, 1918) c
 Plectris aeneofusca (Moser, 1918) c
 Plectris aeneomicans Frey, 1967 c g
 Plectris aeneorufa (Moser, 1918) c g
 Plectris aenescens (Moser, 1918) c
 Plectris aequatorialis (Moser, 1921) c g
 Plectris aerata Burmeister, 1855 c g
 Plectris afflicta Blanchard, 1850 c g
 Plectris ahena Burmeister, 1855 c g
 Plectris alboscutata Frey, 1967 c g
 Plectris albovittata Frey, 1967 c g
 Plectris aliena Chapin, 1934 i c g b
 Plectris alternata Frey, 1967 c g
 Plectris alvarengai Frey, 1967 c g
 Plectris amabilis Frey, 1967 c g
 Plectris ambigua Frey, 1967 c g
 Plectris ambitiosa (Blanchard, 1850) c g
 Plectris amoena Frey, 1973 c g
 Plectris andicola Frey, 1969 c g
 Plectris andina Frey, 1967 c g
 Plectris angerona Blanchard, 1850 c g
 Plectris angusta Frey, 1974 c g
 Plectris anomala (Kirsch, 1885) c g
 Plectris antennalis (Moser, 1924) c g
 Plectris antennata Frey, 1969 c g
 Plectris apicalis (Moser, 1921) c
 Plectris archidonensis (Moser, 1924) c g
 Plectris argentata Frey, 1967 c g
 Plectris argentina (Bruch, 1909) c g
 Plectris atubana Frey, 1972 c g
 Plectris aulai (Bruch, 1909) c g
 Plectris bahiensis Frey, 1975 c g
 Plectris balthasari Frey, 1967 c g
 Plectris baraudi Frey, 1967 c g
 Plectris barbitarsis (Moser, 1919) c g
 Plectris barda Blanchard, 1850 c g
 Plectris bicolor Frey, 1967 c g
 Plectris bilobata (Moser, 1921) c g
 Plectris binotata Blanchard, 1850 c g
 Plectris blanchardi Frey, 1967 c g
 Plectris boliviensis (Moser, 1921) c g
 Plectris bonariensis (Bruch, 1909) c g
 Plectris breiti Frey, 1967 c g
 Plectris breviceps Frey, 1967 c g
 Plectris brevicollis (Moser, 1919) c g
 Plectris brevipes (Blanchard, 1850) c g
 Plectris brevipilosa Moser, 1924 c g
 Plectris brevis Blanchard, 1851 c g
 Plectris brevisetosa Moser, 1918 c g
 Plectris brevitarsis (Blanchard, 1850) c g
 Plectris brittoni Frey, 1967 c g
 Plectris bruchi Moser, 1924 c g
 Plectris burmeisteri (Kirsch, 1871) c g
 Plectris calcarata Frey, 1967 c g
 Plectris caliginosa Blanchard, 1850 c g
 Plectris calva Frey, 1969 c g
 Plectris candezei Frey, 1967 c g
 Plectris caniventris (Burmeister, 1855) c g
 Plectris castaneipennis (Moser, 1921) c g
 Plectris cayennensis (Moser, 1921) c
 Plectris centralis (Bruch, 1909) c g
 Plectris ceylanica (Nonfried, 1894) c g
 Plectris ciliata Frey, 1967 c g
 Plectris cinerascens (Blanchard, 1850) c
 Plectris cinereopilosa (Moser, 1924) c g
 Plectris clypealis Frey, 1975 c g
 Plectris clypeata Burmeister, 1855 c g
 Plectris collarti Frey, 1967 c g
 Plectris comata (Blanchard, 1850) c g
 Plectris conformis Frey, 1967 c g
 Plectris contaminata Blanchard, 1850 c g
 Plectris cordobana (Moser, 1924) c
 Plectris corrientensis (Moser, 1919) c g
 Plectris corumbana Moser, 1921 c g
 Plectris corvicoana (Moser, 1919) c g
 Plectris costulata Frey, 1967 c g
 Plectris coxalis (Moser, 1921) c g
 Plectris crassa Blanchard, 1850 c g
 Plectris crassesetosa Frey, 1967 c g
 Plectris cucullata Burmeister, 1855 c g
 Plectris curta Burmeister, 1855 c g
 Plectris curticollis Frey, 1967 c g
 Plectris curtipilis Frey, 1967 c g
 Plectris curtisetis Frey, 1969 c g
 Plectris cuyana (Bruch, 1909) c g
 Plectris cylindrica Burmeister, 1855 c g
 Plectris cylindriformis Frey, 1967 c g
 Plectris decipiens Burmeister, 1855 c g
 Plectris decolorata Blanchard, 1850 c g
 Plectris delicatula (Blanchard, 1850) c g
 Plectris denominata Frey, 1967 c g
 Plectris densaticollis Frey, 1967 c g
 Plectris densehirsuta Frey, 1967 c g
 Plectris densevestita (Moser, 1924) c g
 Plectris depressicollis Frey, 1967 c g
 Plectris desiderata Evans, 2003 c g
 Plectris devillei Frey, 1967 c g
 Plectris difformis Frey, 1973 c g
 Plectris dimorpha Frey, 1976 c g
 Plectris distincta (Bruch, 1909) c g
 Plectris duplopilosa (Moser, 1921) c g
 Plectris elongata Burmeister, 1855 c g
 Plectris emarginata (Moser, 1921) c g
 Plectris endroedii Frey, 1967 c g
 Plectris eucalypti Frey, 1973 c g
 Plectris eusquamosa Frey, 1975 c g
 Plectris evansi Smith, 2008 c g
 Plectris excisiceps (Moser, 1921) c
 Plectris exigua Frey, 1973 c g
 Plectris fallax (Blanchard, 1850) c g
 Plectris farinosa Burmeister, 1855 c g
 Plectris fassli (Moser, 1919) c
 Plectris festiva (Burmeister, 1855) c
 Plectris flavicornis (Burmeister, 1855) c
 Plectris flavohirta Blanchard, 1851 c g
 Plectris fulgida Frey, 1973 c g
 Plectris fulva Blanchard, 1851 c g
 Plectris fungicola Arrow, 1900 c g
 Plectris fusca Moser, 1918 c g
 Plectris fuscoaenea Moser, 1921 c g
 Plectris fuscoviridis (Moser, 1918) c g
 Plectris fuscula (Moser, 1918) c g
 Plectris gaudichaudi (Blanchard, 1851) c g
 Plectris gebieni (Moser, 1921) c g
 Plectris glabrata Frey, 1967 c g
 Plectris glabripennis Frey, 1967 c g
 Plectris globulicollis Frey, 1973 c g
 Plectris goetzi Frey, 1967 c g
 Plectris gracilicornis Moser, 1918 c g
 Plectris grisea Moser, 1921 c g
 Plectris griseohirta Frey, 1967 c g
 Plectris griseopilosa (Moser, 1921) c
 Plectris griseosetosa (Moser, 1924) c g
 Plectris griseovestita Moser, 1921 c g
 Plectris guayrana Frey, 1967 c g
 Plectris gutierrezi Frey, 1967 c g
 Plectris hellmichi Frey, 1967 c g
 Plectris herteli Frey, 1967 c g
 Plectris hispidula Frey, 1974 c g
 Plectris huedepohli Frey, 1967 c g
 Plectris imitans Frey, 1967 c g
 Plectris incana (Burmeister, 1855) c g
 Plectris indigens Blanchard, 1850 c g
 Plectris inopinata Frey, 1973 c g
 Plectris integrata (Bates, 1887) c g
 Plectris intermixta Frey, 1967 c g
 Plectris juengeri Frey, 1969 c g
 Plectris juncea (Burmeister, 1855) c g
 Plectris junceana Frey, 1969 c g
 Plectris katovichi Smith, 2008 c g
 Plectris kirschi Frey, 1967 c g
 Plectris kochi Frey, 1967 c g
 Plectris kriegi Frey, 1973 c g
 Plectris kulzeri Frey, 1967 c g
 Plectris kuntzeni Moser, 1921 c g
 Plectris laevipennis Frey, 1967 c g
 Plectris laevis Frey, 1967 c g
 Plectris laeviscutata (Moser, 1918) c
 Plectris lanata Frey, 1964 c g
 Plectris laticeps Blanchard, 1850 c g
 Plectris lepida (Burmeister, 1855) c g
 Plectris lignicola Arrow, 1900 c g
 Plectris lignicolor Blanchard, 1850 c g
 Plectris ligulata Frey, 1969 c g
 Plectris lindneri Frey, 1967 c g
 Plectris lineatocollis (Blanchard, 1850) c g
 Plectris lobaticeps Frey, 1967 c g
 Plectris lobaticollis Frey, 1967 c g
 Plectris lojana (Moser, 1924) c g
 Plectris longeantennata Frey, 1967 c g
 Plectris longiclava Frey, 1976 c g
 Plectris longicornis (Burmeister, 1855) c g
 Plectris longitarsis (Bates, 1887) c g
 Plectris longula Moser, 1918 c g
 Plectris luctuosa Frey, 1967 c g
 Plectris maculata (Moser, 1919) c
 Plectris maculicollis (Arrow, 1925) c g
 Plectris maculifera Frey, 1976 c g
 Plectris maculipennis (Moser, 1918) c g
 Plectris maculipyga Moser, 1918 c g
 Plectris maculosa (Moser, 1918) c
 Plectris magdalenae Frey, 1967 c g
 Plectris mandli Frey, 1967 c g
 Plectris marmorea (Guérin-Méneville, 1830) c g
 Plectris martinezi Frey, 1967 c g
 Plectris martinicensis Chalumeau, 1982 c g
 Plectris meridana (Moser, 1918) c
 Plectris metallescens (Moser, 1918) c
 Plectris metallica (Moser, 1918) c g
 Plectris micans (Kirsch, 1885) c g
 Plectris minuta (Moser, 1920) c g
 Plectris molesta (Kirsch, 1873) c g
 Plectris montana Frey, 1967 c g
 Plectris moseri Saylor, 1935 c g
 Plectris murina (Blanchard, 1850) c
 Plectris mus Blanchard, 1851 c g
 Plectris muscula Frey, 1967 c g
 Plectris neglecta Blanchard, 1850 c g
 Plectris nigrita Moser, 1918 c g
 Plectris nigritula (Moser, 1918) c
 Plectris nitidicollis Frey, 1967 c g
 Plectris niveoscutata Moser, 1918 c g
 Plectris nuda Frey, 1967 c g
 Plectris nudicollis Frey, 1967 c g
 Plectris obsoleta Blanchard, 1850 c g
 Plectris obtusa (Burmeister, 1855) c g
 Plectris obtusioides Frey, 1967 c g
 Plectris obtusior Frey, 1967 c g
 Plectris ocularis Frey, 1967 c g
 Plectris ohausi (Bruch, 1909) c g
 Plectris ohausiana (Moser, 1921) c g
 Plectris ohausiella Frey, 1967 c g
 Plectris olivierai Frey, 1974 c g
 Plectris opacula Moser, 1918 c g
 Plectris ophthalmica Frey, 1967 c g
 Plectris ornaticeps Frey, 1967 c g
 Plectris ornatipennis (Moser, 1921) c
 Plectris orocuensis Frey, 1967 c g
 Plectris palpalis (Moser, 1918) c
 Plectris panamaensis Frey, 1967 c g
 Plectris paraensis Frey, 1967 c g
 Plectris paraguayensis (Moser, 1921) c
 Plectris parallela Frey, 1976 c g
 Plectris paranensis (Moser, 1921) c g
 Plectris parcesetosa Frey, 1976 c g
 Plectris parumsetosa Frey, 1969 c g
 Plectris pauloana Moser, 1924 c g
 Plectris pavida (Burmeister, 1855) c g
 Plectris pedestris Frey, 1967 c g
 Plectris pelliculata (Perty, 1830) c g
 Plectris penaella Frey, 1967 c g
 Plectris penai Frey, 1967 c g
 Plectris pentaphylla (Moser, 1918) c
 Plectris pereirai Frey, 1967 c g
 Plectris perplexa Blanchard, 1850 c g
 Plectris pexa (Germar, 1824) c g
 Plectris picea Evans, 2003 c g
 Plectris pilicollis (Moser, 1921) c g
 Plectris pilifera (Moser, 1919) c
 Plectris pilosa (Moser, 1921) c
 Plectris pilosula (Moser, 1921) c
 Plectris pinsdorfi Frey, 1967 c g
 Plectris piottii (Bruch, 1909) c g
 Plectris plaumanni Frey, 1967 c g
 Plectris plaumanniella Frey, 1967 c g
 Plectris podicalis Moser, 1921 c g
 Plectris postnotata Frey, 1967 c g
 Plectris praecellens Frey, 1969 c g
 Plectris primaria (Burmeister, 1855) c
 Plectris prolata Evans, 2003 c g
 Plectris pruina (Burmeister, 1855) c g
 Plectris pubens (Moser, 1921) c g
 Plectris pubera (Burmeister, 1855) c
 Plectris puberoides Frey, 1976 c g
 Plectris pubescens Blanchard, 1850 c g
 Plectris pusio Frey, 1967 c g
 Plectris putida Frey, 1967 c g
 Plectris pygmaea Frey, 1973 c g
 Plectris quinqueflabellata (Moser, 1926) c
 Plectris reitteri Frey, 1967 c g
 Plectris reticulata Frey, 1967 c g
 Plectris riodejaneiroensis Evans, 2003 c g
 Plectris riveti Frey, 1967 c g
 Plectris roeri Frey, 1967 c g
 Plectris rorida (Burmeister, 1855) c
 Plectris rubescens Blanchard, 1850 c g
 Plectris ruffoi Frey, 1972 c g
 Plectris ruficollis Frey, 1976 c g
 Plectris rufina (Moser, 1926) c g
 Plectris rugiceps (Moser, 1921) c g
 Plectris rugipennis (Moser, 1921) c
 Plectris rugulosa Blanchard, 1850 c g
 Plectris rugulosipennis Blanchard, 1851 c g
 Plectris santaecrucis Frey, 1972 c g
 Plectris santosana Frey, 1967 c g
 Plectris sarana (Moser, 1921) c g
 Plectris schereri Frey, 1967 c g
 Plectris schneblei Frey, 1967 c g
 Plectris schoolmeestersi Smith, 2015 c g
 Plectris scopulata (Burmeister, 1855) c g
 Plectris sculpterata Frey, 1967 c g
 Plectris sculptipennis Frey, 1974 c g
 Plectris scutalis Blanchard, 1850 c g
 Plectris scutellaris Blanchard, 1850 c g
 Plectris sequela Evans, 2003 c g
 Plectris sericea (Moser, 1921) c g
 Plectris setifera Burmeister, 1855 c g
 Plectris setisparsa (Bates, 1887) c g
 Plectris setiventris Moser, 1918 c g
 Plectris setosa Moser, 1924 c g
 Plectris setosella (Moser, 1919) c g
 Plectris setulifera (Moser, 1919) c g
 Plectris signaticollis Frey, 1974 c g
 Plectris signativentris Moser, 1918 c g
 Plectris similis Frey, 1973 c g
 Plectris sinuaticeps (Moser, 1921) c g
 Plectris sordida (Burmeister, 1855) c
 Plectris sororia (Moser, 1919) c g
 Plectris sparsecrinita Frey, 1976 c g
 Plectris sparsepilosa Frey, 1967 c g
 Plectris sparsepunctata Frey, 1967 c g
 Plectris sparsesetosa (Moser, 1924) c g
 Plectris spatulata Frey, 1967 c g
 Plectris splendens Frey, 1967 c g
 Plectris splendida Frey, 1967 c g
 Plectris squalida Frey, 1967 c g
 Plectris squamiger Frey, 1967 c g
 Plectris squamisetis Frey, 1967 c g
 Plectris subaenea Moser, 1918 c g
 Plectris subcarinata Frey, 1967 c g
 Plectris subcostata Blanchard, 1850 c g
 Plectris subdepressa Blanchard, 1850 c g
 Plectris subglabra (Moser, 1918) c g
 Plectris sulcicollis (Moser, 1919) c
 Plectris suturalis Burmeister, 1855 c g
 Plectris tacoma Smith, 2008 c g
 Plectris talinay Mondaca, 2010 c g
 Plectris tarsalis (Moser, 1919) c g
 Plectris tenebrosa Frey, 1967 c g
 Plectris tenueclava Frey, 1976 c g
 Plectris tenuevestita Frey, 1967 c g
 Plectris tessellata Burmeister, 1855 c g
 Plectris tetraphylla Frey, 1967 c g
 Plectris teutoniensis Frey, 1969 c g
 Plectris tolimana (Moser, 1921) c
 Plectris tomentosa Serville, 1825 c g
 Plectris tricostata (Burmeister, 1855) c g
 Plectris tristis Frey, 1967 c g
 Plectris truncata (Blanchard, 1850) c
 Plectris tuberculata (Moser, 1919) c
 Plectris tucumana (Bruch, 1909) c g
 Plectris umbilicata Frey, 1967 c g
 Plectris umbrata Frey, 1967 c g
 Plectris unidens Frey, 1967 c g
 Plectris validior Burmeister, 1855 c g
 Plectris variegata (Moser, 1919) c g
 Plectris variipennis Moser, 1921 c g
 Plectris vauriella Frey, 1967 c g
 Plectris vestita (Burmeister, 1855) c
 Plectris vicina Frey, 1967 c g
 Plectris vilis (Burmeister, 1855) c g
 Plectris villiersi Frey, 1967 c g
 Plectris violascens Blanchard, 1851 c g
 Plectris virescens (Blanchard, 1846) c g
 Plectris viridifusca (Moser, 1918) c
 Plectris viridimicans (Moser, 1918) c
 Plectris vitticollis Moser, 1918 c g
 Plectris vittipennis Frey, 1972 c g
 Plectris vonvolxemi Frey, 1967 c g
 Plectris wittmeri Frey, 1967 c g
 Plectris witzgalli Frey, 1973 c g
 Plectris wolfrumi Frey, 1969 c g
 Plectris yungasa Frey, 1975 c g
 Plectris zikani (Moser, 1924) c
 Plectris zischkaella Frey, 1967 c g
 Plectris zischkai Frey, 1967 c g

Data sources: i = ITIS, c = Catalogue of Life, g = GBIF, b = Bugguide.net

References

Plectris
Articles created by Qbugbot